Winfred is an unincorporated community and census-designated place (CDP) in Lake County, South Dakota, United States, approximately  west of Madison. The population was 38 as of the 2020 census. Winfred has been assigned the ZIP code of 57076.

History
Winfred was laid out in 1882. The town was unincorporated in 1995.

Geography
Winfred is in western Lake County, in the northwest part of Winfred Township. Its western boundary is the border with Miner County. U.S. Route 81 and South Dakota Highway 34, running concurrently, form the northern border of the community. The two highways lead east to Madison, the county seat, while to the west they divide a short distance into Miner County. US-81 leads south  to Interstate 90 south of Salem, while SD-34 leads west  to Howard.

Lake Winfred is a natural water body northeast of the center of town.

Demographics

References

Census-designated places in Lake County, South Dakota
Census-designated places in South Dakota